Brett Jon Salisbury (born October 11, 1968) is a former college football quarterback at University of Oregon, BYU, and Wayne State College.

Early life
Salisbury, the younger brother of former NFL quarterback Sean Salisbury, grew up in Escondido, California. He was a pitcher for the Escondido Little League that finished fifth in the 1981 Little League World Series. He attended Orange Glen High School, where he was quarterback for the school's football team. A highly sought-after recruit, Salisbury graduated in 1986 and accepted a football scholarship to Brigham Young University.

Football career
At BYU, Salisbury backed up eventual Heisman Trophy winner Ty Detmer. He left BYU after two years and attended Palomar College, where he was named a JC Gridwire All-American and a California offensive player of the year. Salisbury set a number of scoring and passing records that still stand at the school. In 1991, he transferred to the University of Oregon, where he was considered a successor to Bill Musgrave. After losing the starting job due to a hernia injury in training camp, Salisbury primarily backed up regular starter Danny O'Neil, but started three games for the Ducks after injuries to O'Neil.

In 1992, Salisbury left Oregon to pursue a starting job at a Division II college. After sitting out a year, he began playing for Wayne State College in 1993. At Wayne State, Salisbury led the Wildcats to a 9–1 record while ranking second in Division II for passing efficiency with a rating of 166.3 and third in total offense with 373.2 yards per game. He was nominated for the Harlon Hill Trophy, awarded to the most outstanding Division II football player.

After college, Salisbury played in the EFAF European League with the Helsinki Giants and Prague Panthers.

Post-football career
In 2008, Salisbury wrote a book titled, "The Transform Diet", which was published by the self-publishing company, iUniverse.

Salisbury is a member of the Church of Jesus Christ of Latter-day Saints.

References

1968 births
Living people
Sportspeople from Escondido, California
Players of American football from Dayton, Ohio
American football quarterbacks
BYU Cougars football players
Oregon Ducks football players
Wayne State Wildcats football players
Palomar Comets football players